Yuji Aida (born 4 July 1999) is a Japanese judoka.

He is the bronze medallist of the 2019 Judo Grand Slam Osaka in the -66 kg category.

References

External links
 

1999 births
Living people
Japanese male judoka
21st-century Japanese people